Igneomyia is a genus of parasitic flies in the family Tachinidae. There are at least two described species in Igneomyia.

Species
These two species belong to the genus Igneomyia:
 Igneomyia ferruginea Mesnil, 1970
 Igneomyia ignea (Mesnil, 1944)

References

Further reading

 
 
 
 

Tachinidae
Articles created by Qbugbot